The Banjara Hound, also known as the Vanjari Hound, is a breed of dog found in India. It is a sighthound-type dog bred and used for hunting by the nomadic Banjara of Maharashtra. The Banjara Hound is a rough-coated breed of sighthound, usually brindle or solid-coloured.

See also
 Dogs portal
 List of dog breeds
 List of dog breeds from India

References 

Dog breeds originating in India
Dog landraces